Business class usually refers to a class of seating, a division of accommodation found first on airlines, and later in other transport and hospitality industries.

Business class may also refer to:

 Merchant class, a social class
 Businesspeople collectively
 Business Class, a trim class found in the mainframe computer line IBM Z
 Freightliner Business Class M2, medium-duty trucks
 Freightliner Business Class (FL-Series), medium-duty trucks

See also

 
 Business class airline
 business (disambiguation)
 class (disambiguation)